The Mark 18 nuclear bomb, also known as the SOB or Super Oralloy Bomb, was an American nuclear bomb design which was the highest yield fission bomb produced by the US.  The Mark 18 had a design yield of 500 kilotons.  Noted nuclear weapon designer Ted Taylor was the lead designer for the Mark 18.

The Mark 18 was tested once, in the Ivy King nuclear test at the Enewetak atoll in the Pacific Ocean.  The test was a complete success at full yield.

Description
The Mark 18 bomb design used an advanced 92-point implosion system, derived from the Mark 13 nuclear bomb and its ancestors the Mark 6 nuclear bomb, Mark 4 nuclear bomb, and Fat Man Mark 3 nuclear bomb of World War II.  Its normal mixed uranium/plutonium fissile core ("pit") was replaced with over 60 kg of pure highly enriched uranium or HEU.  With a natural uranium tamper layer, the bomb had over four critical masses of fissile material in the core, and was unsafe: the accidental detonation of even one of the detonator triggers would likely cause a significant (many kilotons of energy yield) explosion.  An aluminum/boron chain designed to absorb neutrons was placed in the fissile pit to reduce the risk of accidental high yield detonation, and removed during the last steps of the arming sequence.

Deployment
Beginning in March 1953, the United States deployed a number of Mark 18 bombs.  A total of 90 were manufactured and placed in service.

The weapon had a short lifetime, and was replaced by thermonuclear weapons in the mid-1950s.  The Mark 18 weapons were all modified into lower yield Mark 6 nuclear bomb variants in 1956.

See also
 List of nuclear weapons
 Ivy King
 Nuclear weapon design
 Mark 13 nuclear bomb
 Mark 6 nuclear bomb
 Mark 4 nuclear bomb
 Fat Man Mark 3 nuclear bomb
 Orange Herald

References

Cold War aerial bombs of the United States
Nuclear bombs of the United States
Military equipment introduced in the 1950s